Florian Yves Le Joncour (born 3 February 1995) is a French footballer who plays as a centre-back for RWDM.

Career

Le Joncour started his career with French fourth division side US Concarneau.

In 2015, he signed for Caen in the French Ligue 1.

In 2016, Le Joncour was sent on loan to French third division club Avranches.

In 2018, he returned to US Concarneau in the French third division.

In 2020, he signed for Belgian outfit RWDM after receiving offers from Portugal and the French third division. On 22 August 2020, Le Joncour debuted for RWDM during a 2–0 win over Club NXT. On 25 April 2021, he scored his first goal for RWDM during a 3–0 win over Lierse K.

References

External links
 
 

French expatriate footballers
French expatriate sportspeople in Belgium
Expatriate footballers in Belgium
Living people
1995 births
Association football defenders
Championnat National 3 players
US Concarneau players
Stade Malherbe Caen players
US Avranches players
R.W.D. Molenbeek players
Championnat National players
Sportspeople from Quimper
Challenger Pro League players
French footballers
Footballers from Brittany